The Z8000 ("zee- or zed-eight-thousand") is a 16-bit microprocessor introduced by Zilog in early 1979. The architecture was designed by Bernard Peuto while the logic and physical implementation was done by Masatoshi Shima, assisted by a small group of people. In contrast to most designs of the era, the Z8000 did not use microcode which allowed it to be implemented in only 17,500 transistors.

The Z8000 was not Z80-compatible, although it featured many of the well-received design notes that made the Z80 popular. Among these was the ability for its registers to be combined and used as a single larger register - while the Z80 allowed two 8-bit registers to be used as a single 16-bit register, the Z8000 expanded this by allowing two 16-bit registers to operate as a 32-bit register, or four to operate as a 64-bit register. These combined registers were particularly useful for mathematical operations.

Although it was an attractive design for its era, and saw some use in the early 1980s, it was never as popular as the Z80. It was released after the 16-bit Intel 8086 (April 1978) and the same time as the less-expensive Intel 8088, and only months before the Motorola 68000 (September 1979), which had a 32-bit instruction set architecture and was roughly twice as fast.

The Zilog Z80000 was a 32-bit follow-on design, launched in 1986.

Features

The Z8000 initially shipped in two versions; the Z8001 with a full 23-bit external address bus to allow it to access up to 8 megabytes of memory, and the Z8002, which supported only 16-bit addressing to allow 64 kilobytes of memory. This allowed the Z8002 to have eight fewer pins, shipping in a smaller 40-pin DIP format that made it less expensive to implement.

The series was later expanded to include the Z8003 and Z8004, updated versions of the Z8001 and Z8002, respectively. These versions were designed to provide improved support for virtual memory, adding new status registers to indicate segmentation faults (test and set) and provide an abort capability.

Registers
The register set consisted of sixteen 16-bit general purpose registers, labeled R0 through R15. The registers can be concatenated into eight 32-bit registers, labeled RR0/RR2/../RR14, or into four 64-bit registers, labeled RQ0/RQ4/RQ8/RQ12. The first eight registers can be also subdivided into sixteen 8-bit registers, labeled RL0 though RL7 for the lower byte and RH0 through RH7 for the upper (high) byte. Register R15 is designated as stack pointer. On the Z8001, register R14 is used to add a fixed offset to the stack pointer, and the program counter is expanded to 32-bits to include a similar offset.

There was both a user mode ("normal") and a supervisor mode, selected by bit 14 in the flag register. In supervisor mode, the stack registers point to the system stack and all privileged instructions are available. In user mode, the stack registers point to the normal stack and all privileged instructions will generate a fault. Having separate modes and stacks greatly adds to the performance of context switches between user programs and an operating system.

Memory handling
Like the Z80 before it, the Z8000 included a system to automatically refresh dynamic RAM. In most systems this is normally handled by the video display controller or external logic. This was implemented via a separate Refresh Counter (RC) register that held the currently updating page of memory. The feature is turned on by setting the most significant bit of the RC, bit 15, to 1. The following six bits, 14 through 9 are a rate, measured in terms of every 4th clock cycle. With a standard 4 MHz clock, that allows the refresh to be called every 1 to 64 microseconds. The remaining 8 bits select a row in memory to refresh.

The Z8000 used a segmented memory map, with a 7-bit "segment number" and a 16-bit offset. Both numbers were represented by pins on the Z8001, meaning that it could directly address a 23-bit memory, or 8 MB. Instructions could only directly access a 16-bit offset. This allowed the instruction format to be smaller; a system with direct access to a 23-bit address would need to read three bytes (24-bits) from memory for every address referred to in the code, thus requiring two reads on a 16-bit bus. With segments, the addresses needed only a single 16-bit read which is then added to a segment number to produce the complete address. The segment number only needed to be updated when the data crossed the 16-bit/64 KB boundaries.

When represented internally, addresses were all 32 bits long. This consisted of an upper 16-bit word with a leading 0 in bit 15, the 7-bit segment number, and then 8 zeros. This required more memory to store, as each 23-bit address used up 32 bits of register space, but allowed the addresses to be cleanly stored in the 16-bit registers and can be more easily pushed and popped from the stack, which occurred in 16-bit words.

The optional 48-pin Z8010 memory management unit (MMU) expanded the memory map to 16 MB by translating the 23-bit address from the CPU to a 24-bit one. Internally, it held a list of 64 segments and an 8-bit pointer to the physical location of that segment in RAM. When the CPU attempted to access a particular segment, the Z8010 would translate that into an 8-bit address on the address bus, and then pass the 16-bit offset on unchanged. This allowed multiple programs to be spread out in physical RAM, each one given its own space to work in while believing they were accessing the entire 8 MB of RAM. The segments were variable length, expanding up to 64 KB in order to allow the entire memory to be accessed from 64 segments. If more than 64 segments were needed, multiple Z8010s could be used. The Z8010 was not available at the time of launch, and was ultimately nine months to a year late.

With the release of the Z8003/Z8004, the Z8015 was added to the lineup, adding paged memory support. The main difference is that the Z8015 breaks down the memory into 64 2 KB blocks, whereas the Z8010 broke memory into 64 variable-sized blocks, up to 64 KB each. Additionally, the Z8015 expands the segment number from 7 to 12 bits, and then using those as the most significant bits of the 23-bit overall address, overriding the upper bits of the original 16-bit offset. The advantage to this access scheme is that it is easy to read or write 2 KB blocks to a hard drive, so this pattern more closely matches what will ultimately happen on a segfault.

Other features
One uncommon feature found on the Z8000, more commonly associated with minicomputers, was direct support for vectored interrupts. Interrupts are used by external devices to notify the processor that some condition has been met; a common use is to indicate that data from a slow process like reading a floppy disk is now available and the CPU can read the data into memory.

Normally on small machines, an interrupt causes special code to run that examines various status bits and memory locations to decide what device actually called the interrupt and why. In some designs, especially those intended for realtime computing, a bit of memory is set aside as a set of pointers, or vectors, to the code handling a particular device. The devices causing the interrupt then set some state, typically via pins on the CPU, to indicate a particular interrupt number, N. When the interrupt is called, the CPU immediately jumps through Nth entry in the table, avoiding any need to decode the interrupt. This can greatly speed up the interrupt servicing by avoiding having to run additional operations, while also simplifying the interrupt handling code.

In the Z8000, a new register supports vectors, the New Program Status Area Pointer. This was similar to a memory address in a register, consisting of two 16-bit values with the upper 16-bits holding the segment number. The lower 16-bits were then divided in half, the upper 8-bit containing an offset and the lower 8-bits empty. To call a particular vector, the external device presented the lower 8-bits (or 9 in some cases) on the address bus, and the complete vector address was then constructed from the three values.

Z8000 CPU based systems
In the early 1980s, the Zilog Z8000 CPU was popular for desktop-sized Unix machines. These low-cost Unix systems allowed small businesses to run a true multi-user system and share resources (disk, printers) before networking was common. They usually had only RS-232 serial ports (4–16) and parallel printer ports instead of built-in graphics, as was typical for servers of the time.

Z8000-based computer systems included Zilog's own System 8000 series, as well as other manufacturers: 
 1980: C8002 made by Onyx Systems used the Z8002, ran Version 7 Unix, had C, FORTRAN 77 and COBOL compilers available. It had eight serial ports for terminal connections, 1 QIC tape drive and cost ~$25k. The main processor offloaded the disk, tape, and serial I/O operations to a Z80 processor on a second board.
 1981: Zilog Systems Z-Lab 8000 Programmer's Development System, available as a Model 20 system with 256 KB of RAM and single 24 MB hard drive, priced at $27,000, or a Model 30 system with 512 KB of RAM and dual hard drives, priced at $33,950, ran the Zeus enhanced version of Unix from Zilog. Zilog followed up with the Series 8000, a multi-user business system that, like the Z-Lab 8000, was based on the 6 MHz Z8001A with three Z8010A memory management units.
 1981-1982: Plexus Industries' P/40 employed an Z8000-based processor along with a number of peripheral controllers designed to maximise data transfer performance, claiming direct memory access throughput of up to 3 MB per second. A "typical eight-user P/40 configuration" with 512 KB of RAM and 72 MB hard drive cost $49,500, with a Unix licence costing $5,000 extra. Plexus followed up with the P/25 in 1982, claiming similar performance to a PDP-11/70 system. A later Plexus model, the P/60, employed the Z8000 as an input/output controller but introduced the Motorola 68000 as the main CPU. The Plexus P/35 retained this general architecture.
 1982: Olivetti M20, a non-IBM-compatible PC that ran Olivetti PCOS, a derivative of COSMOS or CP/M 8000.
 1982-1983: C5002A, C8002A and Sundance-16 from Onyx Systems used the Z8001 and ran Unix System III.
 1983: Zilog Systems 8000 Series Two featured a faster 11.1 MHz Z8001B processor with 32 KB of cache memory, available in three models with 512 KB of RAM expandable to 2 MB in the base model and 4 MB in the other models, with prices for minimal configurations ranging from $19,950 to $29,950. These systems ran Unix System III.
 1983: Exxon Office Systems 500 series and 8400 series.
 1980-1986: Olivetti Linea 1 S1000, S6000, M30, M40, M50, M60, M70. These minicomputers from Olivetti all ran BCOS/COSMOS.
 1985: the cancelled Commodore 900 computer project
 1987–1989: the East German EAW (Elektro-Apparate-Werke) produced the Workstation/Multiuser System P8000 based on the East German U8000 clone of the Z8000.

The Zilog S8000 computer came out with a version of Unix called ZEUS (Zilog Enhanced Unix System). ZEUS was a port of Unix Version 7 and included what were referred to as 'the Berkeley Enhancements'. ZEUS included a version of COBOL called RM/COBOL (Ryan McFarland COBOL). The availability of RM/COBOL allowed many commercial applications to be quickly ported to the S8000 computer although this did not help its long-term success. The S8000 did find some success with the IRS and tax preparers in United States, who used the model for processing of electronically filed tax returns.

Despite a somewhat positive reception as "a reasonably fast supermicro with generally good performance for the price", the 16-bit architectural limitations of the Z8000, with segment handling required to access more than 64 KB in a process, led to questions about the longevity of the Series 8000 products as 32-bit processor architectures from Motorola and National Semiconductor became more widely adopted. Zilog Systems eventually adopted AT&T's 32-bit WE32100 processor, introducing it in a new product, the System 8000/32, alongside 32-bit upgrades to its existing System 8000 Series 2 models. This enabled the introduction of Unix System V on Zilog Systems' products.

The adoption by Zilog's Systems Division of the WE32100, in preference to the continued use of products from Zilog's Component Division, was driven by diverging requirements. Zilog sought to introduce its 32-bit successor to the Z8000, the Z80000, to build on successful adoption of the 16-bit product in military and graphical applications, whereas its Systems Division prioritised Unix support and commercial applications. The conclusion was reached to adopt the WE32100 as "the premier UNIX chip". Zilog subsequently announced an agreement to manufacture the WE32100 chipset for a five year period, being the first alternative source of these products.

There was a Z8000 version of the Xenix Operating System. In 1982, Digital Research and Zilog announced an agreement to make CP/M available for the Z8000.

Namco used the Z8000 series in its Pole Position and Pole Position II arcade games. The machines used two Z8002's, the 64 KB versions of the Z8000.

The reported inclusion of the device within military designs perhaps provides an explanation for the continued survival of the Z8000 until recently, in the shape of the Zilog Z16C01/02 CPUs. Also, the Standard Central Air Data Computer (SCADC) was utilizing the Z8002. The end of life notice from Zilog was sent in 2012.

Limited success 

While the Z8000 did see some use in the early 1980s, it was passed over for other designs relatively quickly.

Federico Faggin, then CEO of Zilog, later suggested this was due to Zilog's financing arrangement with Exxon's venture capital arm, Exxon Enterprises. Enterprises had made a number of investments in the computer field, and by the early 1980s was positioning itself as a competitor to IBM in the large system space. Faggin suggests that IBM thus saw Zilog as a competitor, and refused to consider the Z8000 as a result.

However, an examination of the choices available to designers in the early 1980s suggests there are more prosaic reasons the Z8000 was not more popular:

Comparing assembly language versions of the Byte Sieve, one sees that the 5.5 MHz Z8000's 1.1 seconds is impressive when compared to the 8-bit designs it replaced, including Zilog's 4 MHz Z80 at 6.8 seconds, and the popular 1 MHz MOS 6502 at 13.9. Even the newer 1 MHz Motorola 6809 was much slower, at 5.1 seconds. It also fares well against the 8 MHz Intel 8086 which turned in a time of 1.9 seconds, or the less expensive 5 MHz Intel 8088 at 4 seconds.

While the Intel processors were easily outperformed by the Z8001, they were packaged in 40-pin DIPs, which made them less expensive to implement than the 48-pin Z8001. The Z8002 also used a 40-pin package, but had a 16-bit address bus that could only access 64 KB of RAM, whereas the Intel processors had a 20-bit bus that could access 1 MB of RAM. Internally, the 23-bit addresses of the Z8000 were also more complex to process than Intel's simpler system using 16-bit base addresses and separate segment registers. For those looking for a low-cost option able to access (what was then) large amounts of memory, the Intel designs were competitive and available over a year earlier.

For those looking for pure performance, the Z8000 was the fastest CPU available in early 1979. But this was true only for a period of a few months. The 16/32-bit 8 MHz Motorola 68000 came to market later the same year and turns in a time of 0.49 seconds on the same Sieve test, over twice as fast as the Z8000. Although it used an even larger 64-pin DIP layout, for those willing to move to more than 40-pins this was a small price to pay for what was by far the fastest processor of its era. Its 32-bit instructions and registers, combined with a 24-bit address bus with flat 16 MB addressing, also made it much more attractive to designers, something Faggin admits to.

To add to its problems, when the Z8000 was first released it contained a number of bugs. This was due to its complex instruction decoder, which, unlike most processors of the era, did not use microcode and was dependent on logic implemented directly in the CPU. This allowed the design to eliminate the microcode storage and the associated decoding logic, which reduced the transistor count to 17,500. In contrast, the contemporary Intel 8088 used 29,000 transistors, while the Motorola 68000 of a few months later used 68,000.

Second sources
Several third parties manufactured the Z8000 including AMD, SGS-Ates, Toshiba and Sharp.

References

Bibliography

Further reading
 
 
 
 
 

Computer-related introductions in 1979
Zilog microprocessors
Japanese inventions
16-bit microprocessors